Grassy Fork is a  long 2nd order tributary to Elkin Creek in Wilkes Counties, North Carolina.

Course
Grassy Fork rises about 0.5 miles northeast of Austin in Wilkes County, North Carolina.  Grassy Fork then flows southeast to join Elkin Creek at about 2.5 miles southwest of State Road, North Carolina.

Watershed
Grassy Fork drains  of area, receives about 50.5 in/year of precipitation, has a wetness index of 334.33, and is about 50% forested.

References

Rivers of North Carolina
Bodies of water of Wilkes County, North Carolina